Gordon Young (October 15, 1919 – October 2, 1998) was an American organist and composer of both organ and choral works.

Biography 
Gordon Young was born in McPherson, Kansas on October 15, 1919. He earned a bachelor's degree in music at Southwestern College, Winfield. He then began studying organ with Alexander McCurdy at the Curtis Institute of Music, Philadelphia.

References

External links

1919 births
1998 deaths
20th-century American composers
20th-century classical musicians
20th-century organists
20th-century American male musicians
Composers for pipe organ
American composers
American male composers
American classical organists
American male organists
People from McPherson, Kansas
Male classical organists